María de la Soledad Teresa O'Brien (born September 19, 1966) is an American broadcast journalist and executive producer. Since 2016, O'Brien has been the host for Matter of Fact with Soledad O'Brien, a nationally syndicated weekly talk show produced by Hearst Television. She is chairwoman of Starfish Media Group, a multiplatform media production company and distributor that she founded in 2013. She is also a member of the Peabody Awards board of directors, which is presented by the University of Georgia's Henry W. Grady College of Journalism and Mass Communication.

O'Brien co-anchored CNN's American Morning from 2003 to 2007, and was the anchor of CNN's morning news program Starting Point from 2012 to 2013. In 2013, O'Brien became special correspondent on the Al Jazeera America news program  America Tonight, and is also a correspondent on HBO's Real Sports with Bryant Gumbel.

Early life and education 

O'Brien was born and raised in St. James, New York, on the North Shore of Long Island to Edward Ephrem O'Brien (d. 2019), a mechanical engineering professor at Stony Brook University, and Estela O'Brien (née Marquetti y Mendieta) (d. 2019), a French and English teacher at Smithtown High School West. Her parents were both immigrants and met while they were students at Johns Hopkins University in Baltimore, Maryland. Her father is from Toowoomba, Queensland, in Australia and is of three quarters Irish and one quarter Scottish descent. O'Brien's mother is from Havana, Cuba, and is of Afro-Cuban descent. When she was 14 years old, she came to the United States, sponsored by Oblate Sisters of Providence of Maryland.

Interracial marriage was illegal in Maryland before 1967, so in 1958 O'Brien's parents married in Washington, D.C., where marriage laws were less restrictive. The newly wedded O'Briens then moved to Long Island, to the town of St. James. O'Brien is the fifth of six children, all graduates of Harvard College. Her siblings are law professor Maria Hylton (born 1960), GE corporate lawyer Cecilia Vega (born 1961), businessman Tony O'Brien (born 1962), who heads a documents company, eye surgeon Estela Ogiste (born 1964), and anesthesiologist Orestes O'Brien (born 1967).

O'Brien graduated from Smithtown High School East in 1984. She attended Radcliffe College from 1984 to 1988, starting as pre-med and English and American literature, but left to take a job at WBZ-TV. O'Brien went back to school while pregnant with her first child and received her degree from Harvard in English and American Literature in 2000.

Career 
O'Brien started her career in journalism as a medical reporter on WXKS-FM in Boston because of her background as a pre-med student in college.

NBC and MSNBC (1991–2003) 
O'Brien began her career as an associate producer and news writer at WBZ-TV, then the NBC affiliate in Boston. She joined NBC News in 1991 and was based in New York as a field producer for the Nightly News and Weekend Today. She then worked for three years as a local reporter and bureau chief for San Francisco's then-NBC affiliate KRON-TV. At KRON she was a reporter on "The Know Zone."

Starting in 1996 and during the dot-com boom, O'Brien anchored MSNBC's weekend morning show and the cable network's technology program The Site, which aired weeknights from the spring of 1996 to November 1997. The show was unique in that she interacted with a virtual character named Dev Null, played by Leo Laporte in a motion-capture suit.

From July 1999 to July 2003, O'Brien was co-anchor of the NBC News program, Weekend Today with David Bloom. During that time she contributed reports for the weekday Today Show and for weekend editions of NBC Nightly News. She also covered such notable stories as John F. Kennedy Jr.'s plane crash and the 1990s school shootings in Colorado and Oregon.

CNN (2003–2013)

American Morning (2003–2007) 
O'Brien moved to CNN, where from July 2003 to April 2007, she was co-anchor of the CNN program, American Morning CNN's flagship morning program that aired live from New York City.

In 2004, at the age of 38, she was named to Crain's New York Business "40 Under 40" list.

In 2005, she covered the aftermath of Hurricane Katrina in New Orleans, where she interviewed then head of the Federal Emergency Management Agency (FEMA) Michael Brown.

Starting Point (2012–2013) 
From January 2012 to March 2013, O'Brien was anchor of the CNN program, Starting Point. After CNN canceled American Morning and replaced it with two new programs, Early Start and Starting Point in 2011, O'Brien began anchoring Starting Point on January 2, 2012. It was announced on February 21, 2013, that O'Brien had reached an agreement with CNN to leave Starting Point for the new Starfish Media Group production company. CNN would provide funding in return for non-exclusive rights to its documentaries. March 29, 2013, was her last day on air at CNN as an anchor.

Other work at CNN
In 2009, O'Brien completed a documentary titled  Latino In America, documenting the lives of Latinos living in America. She continued working as a reporter for CNN, mainly hosting "In America" documentaries, and occasionally filled in for Anderson Cooper on Anderson Cooper 360. She also anchored exit poll coverage during CNN's coverage of the primaries and caucuses in the 2008 United States presidential race, and filled in for Paula Zahn on Paula Zahn Now before Zahn left CNN in 2007.

O'Brien anchored a CNN special, Black in America, in July 2007. The program documented the successes, struggles, and complex issues faced by black men, women and families 40 years after the death of Martin Luther King Jr. In the first installment, O'Brien investigated how James Earl Ray, an armed robber and escaped convict, had already spent a year on the run a month before his path collided with that of Dr. King in Memphis, Tennessee. In "The Black Woman & Family", O'Brien explored the varied experiences of black women and families and investigated the disturbing statistics of single parenthood, racial disparities between students, and the devastating toll of HIV/AIDS. The fifth installment of the Black in America series aired in December 2012. Her report on children and race featured the work of Margaret Spencer, based on the Doll Tests of the 1940s, polling children on their general color preferences: "white children have an overwhelming white bias, and black children also have a bias toward white, according to a new study.."

HBO (2013–2014) 
O'Brien's Starfish Media Group signed a deal granting HBO first-look rights for new programs or concepts it develops.

Real Sports with Bryant Gumbel (2013–Present) 
It was announced on June 12, 2013, that O'Brien was joining HBO's Real Sports with Bryant Gumbel sports news magazine as a correspondent.

Podcasting 

In January 2022, O'Brien and personal financial journalist, Jean Chatzky launched a podcast, Everyday Wealth, covering personal finance, the economy, wealth management, and other financial topics. It is sponsored by Edelman Financial Engines.

Other work 

On February 24, 2021, O'Brien testified at a House Committee on Ethics subcommittee hearing on "disinformation and extremism in the media". In addition to denouncing Lou Dobbs and Tucker Carlson for disinformation at the hearing, she claimed MSNBC anchors Rachel Maddow and Lawrence O'Donnell were spreading "Russian conspiracy theories".

Starfish Media Group 
In June 2013, O'Brien formed the production and distribution company Starfish Media Group. Starfish Media Group signed a deal to produce a series of hour-long documentary specials for Al Jazeera America.

In September 2016, O'Brien became a host of the Hearst Television show, Matter of Fact with Soledad O'Brien; in addition to its broadcast availability, it is carried by FYI on Sunday mornings (a network Hearst partly owns).

In 2018, O'Brien hosted the documentary series Mysteries & Scandals on Oxygen.

Other work 

From 2013 to 2016, O'Brien was moderator of National Geographic Bee, replacing Alex Trebek who moderated for 25-plus years.

In 2014, O'Brien co-taught a Harvard University Graduate School of Education class with Professor Joe Blatt on "Advancing the Public Understanding of Education."

On May 1, 2016, O'Brien hosted PBS NewsHour Weekend, filling in for Alison Stewart.

On January 12, 2016, O'Brien appeared on PBS's TV genealogy program, Henry Louis Gates Jr.'s Finding Your Roots. The focus was on O'Brien's Irish ancestry.

In 2016, O'Brien presented the 'I Am Latino in America' tour, with nationwide stops across the United States. The tour was streamed live globally on MOSH.

In May 2022, Soledad O’Brien partnered with JP Morgan to advise and give a lecture at the company’s financial health education, wealth-building, and financial inclusion for Dallas’ Black and Hispanic communities. O’Brien took the stage to discuss potential impacts and value of the event and its subsequent activity. As an Adviser to the summit, O’Brien stated she had made it her mission to ensure that the event isn’t and won’t be lip service without action and outlined plans for future events.

Personal life 
In 1995, O'Brien married Bradford "Brad" Raymond, co-head of investment banking at Stifel. They have four children: two daughters, Sofia (October 2000) and Cecilia (March 2002), and twin sons Charles and Jackson (August 2004).

On the NPR quiz show Wait Wait... Don't Tell Me!, O'Brien explained that in Spanish her full name means "The Blessed Virgin Mary of Solitude". When she started working in TV, many people recommended that she change her name, but she refused.

O'Brien has said she does not speak Spanish fluently.

O'Brien has been riding horses since she was 13 years old, a hobby which she now enjoys with her family. She and her husband run a foundation called PowHERful Foundation (formerly called the Starfish Foundation, and before that the Soledad O'Brien & Brad Raymond Foundation), which mentors women to send them to college. The foundation began in 2011.

On February 7, 2011, O'Brien was inducted as an Honorary Member of Delta Sigma Theta sorority.

Honors 
 1995: Local Emmy, Co-Host Discovery Channel's The Know Zone
 1997: Hispanic Achievement Award in Communications
 2000: Newsweek, Critical Más: 20 for 2000
 2000: People, 50 Most Beautiful
 2004 Crain's New York Business "40 Under 40" honoree
 2004: People en Español, 50 Most Beautiful
 2005:  Black Enterprise, Hot List
 2005: Catalina magazine, Groundbreaking Latina of the Year
 2005: Peabody Award, CNN coverage of Hurricane Katrina
 2006: Newsweek, "15 People Who Make America Great"
 2007: National Association for the Advancement of Colored People (NAACP), President's Award
 2007: Gracie Allen Award
 2008: Morehouse School of Medicine, Soledad O'Brien Freedom's Voice Award, first recipient
 2008: Johns Hopkins Bloomberg School of Public Health, Goodermote Humanitarian Award for Hurricane Katrina and the 2004 Indian Ocean earthquake and tsunami
 2009: Congressional Hispanic Caucus Institute, Medallion of Excellence for Leadership and Community Service Award
 2010: National Association of Black Journalists, Journalist of the Year
 2010: Edward R. Murrow Award, RTDNA/UNITY Award for Latino in America
 2010: Peabody Award, CNN coverage of BP oil spill
 2011: Emmy, Outstanding Live Coverage of a Current News Story Long Form for Crisis in Haiti on the 2010 Haiti earthquake
 2016: Vanderbilt University, The Nichols-Chancellor's Medal
 Irish American Magazine, Top 100 Irish Americans" (twice)
 Alfred I. duPont–Columbia University Award, 2004 Indian Ocean earthquake and tsunami
 Emmy, 2012 election
 Emmy, "Kids on Race"

Leadership and membership 
 2007: Bryant University, Doctor of Humane Letters
 2011: Delta Sigma Theta, Honorary Member
 2013: Harvard University Graduate School of Education, Distinguished Visiting Fellow
 2013: Foundation for the National Archives (Washington, DC), Board of Directors
 2014: Spelman College (Atlanta, GA), Doctor of Humane Letters
 2016: Stony Brook University, Honorary Doctorate of Letters
 ExpandED Schools, formerly The After School Corp (TASC), Leadership Council
 National Association of Black Journalists, Member
 National Association of Hispanic Journalists, Member
 The Harlem School of the Arts, Board Member

Filmography 
 1989: Second Opinion, WXKS-FM (Boston) – Host
 1989: Health Week in Review, WXKS-FM (Boston) – Host
 1989: Eyewitness News First Edition, WBZ-TV (Boston) – Associate producer, Writer
 1991–1993: NBC Nightly News – Producer
 1991–1993: Today – Producer
 1993: KRON-TV (San Francisco) – Reporter
 1993–1996: The Know Zone (TV Series) – Co-host
 1996–1997: The Site, MSNBC (TV Series) – Host
 1997: Imaging America, WNET (New York) – Host
 1997–1999: Morning Blend, MSNBC (TV Series) – Host
 1997–2003: Today, NBC (New York) – Host
 1997–2003: Weekend Today, NBC (New York) – Host
 2003–2007: American Morning, CNN (TV Series) – Co-Host (Producer, 1 episode: "Microsoft Security Suit")
 2007–2011: Special Investigations Unit, CNN – Host
 2007–2011: AC360, CNN – Host
 2007–2011: In America, CNN – Host
 2012–2013: Starting Point, CNN – Host
 2013: America Tonight, Al Jazeera America – Host
 2013–2015: Real Sports with Bryant Gumbel – Correspondent (10 episodes)
 2013: Black in America: Black & Blue – Soledad O'Brien Reports (TV Movie documentary) – Executive producer, Producer, Director, Writer
 2014: Da Sweet Blood of Jesus – Associate producer
 2014: The War Comes Home: Soledad O'Brien Reports (TV Movie documentary) – Executive producer, Producer, Director, Writer
 2015: Kids Behind Bars: A Soledad O'Brien Special Report (TV Movie documentary) – Producer, Director
 2015: Shining a Light: A Concert for Progress on Race in America (TV Movie – Executive producer
 2015: Billboard Women in Music 2015 (TV Movie) – Executive producer
 2015: Babies Behind Bars (Documentary) – Executive producer, Co-director, Writer
 2016: Matter of Fact with Soledad O'Brien, Hearst Television – Host
 2016: Batman v Superman: Dawn of Justice, Herself
 2019: Unbreakable Kimmy Schmidt, Herself

Works and publications 
Books
 
 
Selected works
 2008: Black in America (CNN)
 2009: Latino in America (CNN and CNN en Español)
 2009: Black in America 2 (CNN)
 2010: The Atlanta Child Murders (CNN)
 2011: Don't Fail Me: Education in America (CNN)
 2011: The Women Who Would be Queen (CNN)
 2012: Who Is Black in America? (CNN)
 Almighty Debt (Black in America) (CNN)
 Beyond Bravery: The Women of 9/11
 Children of the Storm
 Crisis in Haiti (Anderson Cooper 360, CNN)
 Don't Fail Me: Education in America (CNN)
 Eyewitness to Murder: The King Assassination (CNN)
 Gary and Tony Have a Baby (CNN)
 Her Children of the Storm
 Latino in America: Courting Their Vote
 Latino in America 2: In Her Corner
 One Crime at a Time
 Pictures Don't Lie
 Rescued
 The New Promised Land – Silicon Valley (Black in America) (CNN)
 The Women Who Would be Queen
 Unwelcome: The Muslims Next Door (CNN)
 Words That Changed a Nation (CNN)

References

External links

 
 Soledad O'Brien at Starfish Media Group
 
 PowHERful Foundation
 
 

1966 births
Living people
20th-century American journalists
21st-century American journalists
American broadcast news analysts
American people of Australian descent
American people of Cuban descent
American people of Irish descent
American people of Scottish descent
American women television journalists
CNN people
Delta Sigma Theta members
Emmy Award winners
Harvard University alumni
Hispanic and Latino American women journalists
Journalists from New York (state)
MSNBC people
Peabody Award winners
People from St. James, New York
People of Afro–Cuban descent
Philanthropists from New York (state)
Radcliffe College alumni